Northwest Hospital may refer to:

 Northwest Hospital (Randallstown, Maryland), the former Baltimore County General Hospital, now part of LifeBridge Health
 Northwest Hospital & Medical Center, Seattle, Washington